Jane Thomas (1899–1976) was an American film actress of the silent era. She starred in a number of independent films during the early 1920s, including Heedless Moths where she doubled for the model Audrey Munson in the acting scenes.

Selected filmography
 S.O.S. (1917)
 The North Wind's Malice (1920)
 Reckless Wives (1921)
 Heedless Moths (1921)
 Silver Wings (1922)
 Queen of the Moulin Rouge (1922)
 The Secrets of Paris (1922)
 How Women Love (1922)
 The Town That Forgot God (1922)
 Breaking Home Ties (1922)
 The Exciters (1923)
 Lost in a Big City (1923)
 The White Rose (1923)
 Life's Greatest Game (1924)
 Blue Water (1924)
 Floodgates (1924)
 The Hoosier Schoolmaster (1924)
 Getting 'Em Right (1925)
 The Adorable Deceiver (1926)
 In Search of a Hero (1926)
 The Law of the Snow Country (1926)
 The Big Show (1926)
 The Hidden Way (1926)
 The Roaring Road (1926)

References

Bibliography
 Katchmer, George A. A Biographical Dictionary of Silent Film Western Actors and Actresses. McFarland, 2015.

External links

American film actresses
1899 births
1976 deaths
People from Chicago
20th-century American actresses
20th-century American people